Sölk Pass (el. 1788 m.) is a high mountain pass in the Austrian Alps in the Bundesland of Styria.

It crosses the Niedere Tauern and connects the Mur River valley with the Enns River valley.

The pass road is a secondary highway and is not cleared in winter. Nearby passes include Radstädter Tauern Pass and the Tauern Tunnel to the west and Triebener Tauern Pass to the east.

See also
 List of highest paved roads in Europe
 List of mountain passes

References

External links
Profile on climbbybike.com

Mountain passes of Styria
Mountain passes of the Alps
Schladming Tauern